The canal boat Ross Barlow is a hybrid hydrogen narrowboat, power-assisted by an electric motor whose electricity is supplied by a fuel cell or a battery. It debuted on 21 September 2007.

History
The Protium Project at the University of Birmingham started at the beginning of 2006. The boat is named in memory of a postgraduate student who was killed in a hang gliding accident in March 2005 at the age of 25. He had worked on the project in its early stages and was an enthusiastic supporter of sustainable energy.

Refueling
The fixed tanks are refuelled at a waterway hydrogen station. The hydrogen is generated by electrolysis using solar or wind turbines.

Specifications

See also
 Hydride compressor
 Hydrogen ship
 Hydrogen storage#Metal hydrides
 Hydrogen vehicle
 Hydrogen economy

References

External links

Hydrogen ships
Barges